Zhang Yan (Chinese: 张彦), courtesy name as Bomei, sobriquet as Wuzheng Daoren, is a Chinese painter in Ming Dynasty, active in 16th and 17th centuries.

Ming dynasty painters